The ITEM Club is an economic forecasting group based in the United Kingdom. ITEM stands for Independent Treasury Economic Model. It was founded in 1977 to produce quarterly economic UK forecasts, which are often mentioned in the UK news media. It is sponsored by EY (Ernst & Young), a firm of business and financial advisers, and was officially named The EY ITEM Club in 2012. It is said to be independent of any political, academic or commercial bias despite corporate sponsorship.

The UK model is used by HM Treasury for its policy analysis and biannual Industry Act forecasts for the Budget. This enables ITEM to explore the implications and unpublished assumptions behind Government forecasts and policy measures. ITEM can test whether Government claims are consistent and can assess which forecasts are credible and which are not.

Dr. Howard Archer is the EY ITEM Club's chief economic adviser, taking over from Professor Peter Spencer in June 2017. Archer joined the EY Item Club after nearly 17 years as Chief UK and European Economist at IHS Global Insight.

References

External links
www.ey.com/uk/economics
 What is the Item club Ernst & Young website (retrieved 24 July 2009)

Economic forecasting
Ernst & Young